The following radio stations broadcast on AM frequency 1629 kHz:

In Australia 
 Rete Italia in Shepparton, Victoria.
 Radio 1629am in Newcastle, New South Wales.
 Vision Christian Radio in Bathurst, New South Wales.

In Japan 
 Highway advisory radio

References

Lists of radio stations by frequency